Mount Vernon Township is one of sixteen townships in Jefferson County, Illinois, USA.  As of the 2010 census, its population was 13,374 and it contained 6,422 housing units.

Geography
The township is centered at 38°21′N 88°52′W (38.349,-88.859). It is traversed north–south by State Route 37, east–west by State Route 15, and diagonally across its southwest corner by State Route 142.

Cities, towns, villages
 Mount Vernon

Unincorporated towns
 Camp Ground at 
 Idlewood at 
 Summersville at 
(This list is based on USGS data and may include former settlements.)

Adjacent townships
 Field Township (north)
 Farrington Township (northeast)
 Webber Township (east)
 Pendleton Township (southeast)
 Dodds Township (south)
 Shiloh Township (west)
 Rome Township (northwest)

Cemeteries
The township contains these nine cemeteries: Atkinson, East Salem, Etheridge Farm, Hopewell, Oakwood, Old Union, Saint Mary's, Sursa and Williams.

Major highways
  Illinois Route 15
  Illinois Route 37
  Illinois Route 142

Airports and landing strips
 Good Samaritan Regional Health Care Center Heliport
 Mount Vernon/Outland Airport

Demographics

Political districts
 Illinois's 19th congressional district
 State House District 107
 State Senate District 54

References
 
 United States Census Bureau 2007 TIGER/Line Shapefiles
 United States National Atlas

External links
 City-Data.com
 Illinois State Archives

Townships in Jefferson County, Illinois
Mount Vernon, Illinois micropolitan area
Townships in Illinois